Kampong Parit is a village in the south-west of Brunei-Muara District, Brunei. The population was 1,299 in 2016. It is one of the villages within Mukim Pengkalan Batu. The postcode is BH1023.

Geography 
As a village subdivision, Kampong Parit is bounded by Kampong Masin to the north, Kampong Junjongan to the east, Kampong Pengkalan Batu to the south, Kampong Panchor Murai to the south-west, and Kampong Batong to the west.

References 

Parit